Imbrasos (Imvrasos), is a river on the Greek island of Samos. In ancient times, it had the epithet Parthenios ('of the maiden'), because the goddess Hera was said to have been born on its bank under a lygos tree. The site became the Heraion, which was the main ancient sanctuary on the island.

The river god Imbrasos was often depicted on Samian coinage, sometimes holding a peacock. In mythology, his wife was the nymph Chesias. Their daughter, Ocyrrhoe, was loved by Apollo.

References

Bibliography 
 
 

Rivers of Greece
Landforms of Samos
Potamoi